Levitas is a surname. Notable people with the surname include: 

Andrew Levitas (born 1977), American artist
Elliott H. Levitas (1930–2022), American politician and lawyer
Maurice Levitas (1917–2001), Irish academic and communist
Max Levitas (1915–2018), Irish communist activist
Ruth Levitas (born 1949), British sociologist